Joe Gibbs Racing (JGR)  is an American professional stock car racing organization owned and operated by former American football coach Joe Gibbs, which first started racing on the NASCAR circuit in 1991. His son, J. D. Gibbs, ran the team with him until his death in 2019.

For the team's first sixteen seasons, JGR ran cars from General Motors. During that period, the team won their first three championships: two in Pontiac Grand Prixs and one in a Chevrolet Monte Carlo. Despite this, Joe Gibbs Racing announced during the 2007 season that they would be ending their arrangement with GM at the end of the year and begin running Toyotas the following season. This partnership would eventually bring Toyota their first Premier series championship when Kyle Busch won in 2015.

In the NASCAR Cup Series, the team currently fields four full-time entries: the No. 11 Toyota Camry for Denny Hamlin, the No. 19 Camry for Martin Truex Jr., the No. 20 Camry for Christopher Bell, and the No. 54 Camry for Ty Gibbs. In the Xfinity Series, the team currently fields three full-time entries: the No. 18 Toyota Supra for Sammy Smith, the No. 19 Supra for Ryan Truex including drivers to be announced, and the No. 20 Supra for John Hunter Nemechek.

The team also has a strong development program for up and coming drivers, grooming future Cup winners Joey Logano and Aric Almirola and winning one championship in the Camping World East Series (now known as the ARCA Menards East Series) with Logano. The team also won the 2021 ARCA Menards Series championship with Ty Gibbs. The organization teamed up with former NFL player Reggie White in 2004 to create a diversity program, fielding drivers such as Almirola, Marc Davis, and Bubba Wallace, and forming the basis for NASCAR's own Drive for Diversity program.

JGR has a technical alliance with 23XI Racing that started in 2021.

NASCAR Cup Series

Overview

The team was founded by Gibbs in 1991 after exploring opportunities with Don Meredith, who currently serves as the team's Executive Vice President. In 1997, Gibbs' son J.D. Gibbs was named team president. In 1998, the team began construction on its current facility in Huntersville, North Carolina. The team expanded to a two-car operation in 1999 with Tony Stewart's No. 20 Home Depot-sponsored car, then a three-car operation in 2005 with the No. 11 FedEx-sponsored car currently driven by Denny Hamlin and owned by Coy Gibbs. The team expanded to four cars for the 2015 season with Carl Edwards driving the No. 19 car, following former Roush Racing teammate Matt Kenseth to JGR.

After winning three Cup championships and over 70 NASCAR races in Chevrolet and Pontiac equipment, it was announced in September 2007 that the team would be switching to Toyota (who had just entered the Cup series that year) following the end of their commitment with General Motors at the end of the season. It was believed that the executives at JGR felt as if they weren't as important as some of the other GM teams such as Hendrick Motorsports and Richard Childress Racing, leading to the decision to swap manufacturers. According to Joe Gibbs, Toyota offered the team resources and options they "were not going to be able to afford to do" if they remained at GM.

In 2012, JGR shuttered its in-house Sprint Cup Series engine program, merging with California-based Toyota Racing Development which currently provides engines to JGR as well as 23XI Racing. The team continues to build engines for its own Xfinity Series operations and those of RAB Racing and JGL Racing, the Craftsman Truck Series operations of Kyle Busch Motorsports, and the Truck Series and ARCA Menards Series operations of Venturini Motorsports. The team had a technical alliance with Furniture Row Racing, a single car team based in Denver, Colorado, before their closure following the 2018 season.

Car No. 11 history

Multiple drivers (2004–2005)
The No. 11 car (the number J. D. Gibbs wore playing football at College of William & Mary) began in 2004. Ricky Craven, recently released from PPI Motorsports finished 30th at Talladega with sponsorship from Old Spice, and Busch Series driver J. J. Yeley ran two races in the car with Vigoro/The Home Depot sponsorship.

The No. 11 car went full-time in 2005, with new sponsor FedEx coming on to fund the full season in a multi-year deal. Jason Leffler, who had driven for JGR in the Busch series, was signed to drive the No. 11 for the full season, while Dave Rogers was named the crew chief. The new team struggled early on in the season. Leffler missed the Coca-Cola 600 at Charlotte, with FedEx Freight moving over to the 18 car that Bobby Labonte would drive to a second-place finish. Rogers was reassigned and replaced with veteran crew chief Mike Ford in June, then former Cup champion Terry Labonte was hired to run the road course at Sonoma, qualifying 8th and finishing a solid 12th. After 19 starts with a best finish of 12th and sitting 36th in points, Leffler was released from the ride. Terry Labonte ran the next three races, then ran the Fall Richmond race finishing 9th. J. J. Yeley ran 4 races with a best finish of 25th. In November, it was announced that Denny Hamlin would drive the car for the remainder of the season, then run for Rookie of the Year in 2006. Hamlin ran seven races, finished in the top 10 three times, and earned a pole at Phoenix International Raceway.

Denny Hamlin (2005–present)

Hamlin was awarded the No. 11 FedEx Express full-time ride in 2006 in addition to his full-time Busch schedule in the No. 20 Rockwell Automation Chevrolet. Hamlin was part of a large and strong rookie class, including teammate J. J. Yeley, Clint Bowyer, Martin Truex Jr., David Stremme, Brent Sherman, and Reed Sorenson. Hamlin opened the season by winning the Budweiser Shootout non-points race, holding off Dale Earnhardt Jr. on a green-white-checker restart. In June, Hamlin scored his first Cup Series victory at the difficult Pocono Raceway. Hamlin started on the pole, then battled back from a cut tire to take the victory. In his return to the track in July, Hamlin again won the pole, then proceeded to lead 151 of 200 laps en route to a second victory, the first rookie to sweep both Pocono races. Hamlin credited his prowess on the track to practicing on the racing simulator NASCAR Racing 2003 Season. Hamlin's strong performance earned the rookie a berth in the Chase for the NEXTEL Cup, where he would finish 3rd in points. Until 2016, Hamlin was the only rookie to make the Chase.

In 2007, Hamlin won the first of two races at New Hampshire International Speedway 2007 and finished 12th in points. In 2008, Hamlin won the Gatorade Duel and the first race at Martinsville Speedway, and improved to eighth in points. He qualified for the Chase again in 2009 after winning the second race at Pocono Raceway and Richmond International Raceway. He ended the season with four victories after winning Martinsville and Homestead-Miami Speedway in the chase.
2010 was Hamlin and the 11 team's breakout year. They won at Martinsville and Denny followed the win by having knee surgery. After the surgery, the team won 4 of the next 10 races at Texas, Darlington, Pocono, and Michigan. The team made the chase after another win at Richmond. The team won races during the Chase at Martinsville and Texas and held the points lead going into the season finale. However, an early wreck would put them behind the competition, and Hamlin wound up finishing second to Jimmie Johnson during the 2010 chase. Hamlin later admitted to putting too much pressure on himself during the Chase, which mentally impacted him. As a result, Mike Ford took a "no compromise" attitude for 2011, hoping to right the ship. However, the team struggled throughout 2011, with multiple blown engines and a single win at Michigan to push the No. 11 into the Chase. Hamlin would finish 9th in the final standings. At season's end, Mike Ford was released as crew chief and was replaced by Tony Stewart's crew chief Darian Grubb.

Under Darian Grubb, the team started 2012 off in the best way possible by winning the second race of the season at Phoenix. That win was followed by another victory at Kansas six weeks later. The 11 team once again proved dominant on the short tracks pulling off a convincing win in the Bristol Night Race in August. The week after Bristol, the No. 11 FedEx team brought home another victory at Atlanta Motor Speedway, making the No. 11 the car number with the most wins in NASCAR with 200 wins. Hamlin then won the Sylvania 300, giving Joe Gibbs Racing its 100th win.

Hamlin's 2013 season began with an on-and-off track feud with former teammate Joey Logano. Initially started on Twitter, the on track incidents began at Bristol in March, where Hamlin spun Logano in turns 1 and 2, leading Logano to confront Hamlin after the race. The rivalry continued into the next race at Auto Club Speedway, where the two fought for the lead in the closing laps. In the final corner, the two collided, allowing JGR teammate Kyle Busch to win the race, and sending Hamlin's 11 car into a non-SAFER barrier wall near pit road. This wreck would mark the beginning of a difficult season for Hamlin, as he suffered a lower back fracture and was forced to sit out several races. Veteran Mark Martin replaced Hamlin at one of Denny's better tracks, Martinsville Speedway, where he scored a top 10. Brian Vickers then drove the car for the next three races, scoring an 8th-place finish at Texas. Though Hamlin returned to the car at Talladega Superspeedway, he never returned to form during the year, with only 8 top 10s on the year. He did score a win at the season finale at Homestead.

After Jason Leffler's death in 2013, the 11 team paid tribute to their former driver by running a white FedEx scheme at Michigan similar to the one Leffler ran in 2005.

In the 2014 Auto Club 400, Sam Hornish Jr. replaced Hamlin due to Hamlin having what was thought to be a sinus infection, but later revealed to be a piece of metal in his eye that impaired his vision. Hornish, who was actually on standby for teammate Matt Kenseth, finished a solid 17th in his return to Cup.

At the 2015 Food City 500, Erik Jones replaced Hamlin after the latter suffered neck spasms. Jones took the car to a 26th-place finish, but Hamlin started the race and was credited with the finish.

In 2016, Hamlin started his season out well, winning the 2016 Daytona 500 by beating out Martin Truex Jr. by 0.010 seconds, the closest finish in Daytona 500 history. The win was also the first for his rookie crew chief, Mike Wheeler. He would also win Watkins Glen and Richmond to finish 6th in the standings

In 2017, Hamlin won at the first New Hampshire race, and Darlington and finished 6th in points for the second straight year.

Hamlin started the 2018 season with a third-place finish at the Daytona 500. However, for the first time in his career, he finished a season winless. Despite this, he stayed consistent enough to make the Playoffs. Hamlin was eliminated in the Round of 16 after the Charlotte Roval race and finished the season 11th in points.

Hamlin started the 2019 season with his second Daytona 500 win after surviving a mass pile-up with 10 laps to go in the race. The win was about a month after the passing of J. D. Gibbs. Hamlin celebrated by performing a slow lap of honor instead of a burnout to preserve the car. He scored his second win of the season at Texas. At Martinsville, Hamlin collided with Logano on turn four, squeezing Logano into the outside wall and causing him to lose a tire and spin out two laps later. Hamlin finished fourth while Logano salvaged an eighth-place finish. After the race, Hamlin and Logano discussed the incident before Logano slapped Hamlin's right shoulder, sparking a fight between the two. NASCAR suspended Dave Nichols Jr., the No. 22 team's tire technician, for one race for pulling Hamlin down to the ground during the altercation. Hamlin would make the Championship 4 for the first time since 2014 as well as earn his fourth pole at Homestead after qualifying got canceled due to rain, but finished 10th in the race and fourth in the final standings.

Hamlin started the 2020 season by winning the 2020 Daytona 500, becoming only the fourth driver to win back-to-back Daytona 500s after Richard Petty, Cale Yarborough, and Sterling Marlin. Before the Las Vegas race, the team was docked 10 driver and owner points for an L1 level penalty during pre-race inspection. Following the 2020 Coca-Cola 600, crew chief Chris Gabehart, car chief Brandon Griffeth, and engineer Scott Simmons were suspended for four races after a tungsten ballast came loose and fell off the frame rail of the car during the start of the race. Hamlin once again made the Championship 4 and had a more competitive race for the championship than in the previous year, but still finished fourth in the race and final standings behind 3rd-place finisher Joey Logano, runner-up Brad Keselowski, and Champion Chase Elliott.

In 2021 Hamlin went winless during the regular season but stayed very consistent scoring 13 top fives and 17 top tens. He scored his first win of the season in the first playoff race at Darlington and then won again at Las Vegas. Hamlin made the final four for the third straight year but once again came up short finishing 3rd in points behind runner-up and teammate Martin Truex Jr and champion Kyle Larson.

Hamlin started the 2022 season with a 37th place finish at the 2022 Daytona 500. Aside from a win at Richmond, he struggled with finishes outside the top 10 during the first 11 races. On May 3, Gabehart was suspended for four races due to a tire and wheel loss at Dover. On May 29, Hamlin won the 2022 Coca-Cola 600 for his second win of the season. He won at Pocono, but was disqualified and the No. 11 team was served an L1 penalty after a post-race inspection revealed an alteration to the car's front fascia. It was revealed that the lower corners and wheel openings of the front fascia were wrapped with a layer of clear vinyl that was not removed prior to the application of the paint scheme wrap, resulting in a slight irregularity in the car's dimensions. Hamlin became the first NASCAR Cup Series winner to be disqualified since 1960, when Emanuel Zervakis was stripped of his win at Wilson Speedway for an oversized fuel tank. Hamlin was eliminated following the Round of 8 after finishing sixth at Martinsville.

Hamlin began the 2023 season with a 17th place finish at the 2023 Daytona 500. On March 15, he was docked 25 points and fined 50,000 after admitting on his weekly podcast Actions Detrimental that he intentionally wrecked Chastain during the closing laps of the Phoenix race.

Car No. 11 results

Car No. 19 history

As No. 80 (2003–2004, 2007)

Before expanding to four full-time cars, JGR had occasionally fielded a fourth car for R&D or driver development purposes. Mike Bliss drove several races for JGR in 2003 & 2004 in a No. 80 car. In 2007, development driver Aric Almirola made his NEXTEL Cup debut in the No. 80 at Las Vegas with Joe Gibbs Driven sponsoring. Almirola started 31st and finished 40th after a crash. He was scheduled to drive at the All-Star Race and Coca-Cola 600, but he suffered a practice crash and the car was withdrawn from both races. He would leave the team later in the season for Ginn Racing and Dale Earnhardt, Inc.

As No. 02 (2008–2009)
In 2008, 18-year-old Joey Logano was scheduled to run several late-season races in preparation for running the full 2009 season. Logano drove the No. 02 (reverse of the 20), with an inverted Home Depot scheme of teammate Tony Stewart's. He was scheduled to make his Sprint Cup debut at Richmond International Raceway, but qualifying was rained out by Hurricane Hanna. The 02 attempted again at Loudon and at Atlanta, but qualifying was rained out in both races as well, leading Logano to make his debut in JGR-affiliated Hall of Fame Racing's No. 96 at Loudon and miss the Atlanta race. Logano made the race in his fourth attempt with Gibbs at Texas, starting 43rd and last and finishing 40th, several laps down.

In 2009 Farm Bureau Insurance, who had been banned from the Nationwide Series due to the Viceroy Rule, moved up to sponsor 6 Sprint Cup Series races for JGR, including 3 for the 02 car at Charlotte, Texas, and Homestead. David Gilliland was tabbed to drive the car in the three events, with a best finish of 25th at Charlotte. After the 2009 season, Farm Bureau Insurance announced they would not return for the 2010 season.

As No. 81 (2013)
In 2013, Elliott Sadler was signed to drive the renumbered No. 81 (reverse of 18) for three races, with his former sponsor at Robert Yates Racing, Mars, Inc., promoting their new Alert Energy Caffeine Gum on the car. Sadler was scheduled to run at Kansas Speedway, Talladega Superspeedway and a third unannounced race. The deal was made in part to avoid conflict on the 18 car with Kyle Busch's sponsor Monster Energy. For Sadler, it was his first start in the Sprint Cup Series since the 2012 Daytona 500, and his first opportunity since he was forced to turn down a part-time deal at Michael Waltrip Racing that same year (ultimately taken by 2013 teammate Brian Vickers) by then-owner Richard Childress. At Kansas, he got out of the racing groove and wrecked in turn 3 on lap 85, relegating him to a 40th-place finish. He failed to qualify at Talladega after rain washed out qualifying and was set by owner points as the No. 81 was too low in points. After Alert Energy was pulled from the market, Doublemint sponsored the car at Talladega.

Carl Edwards (2015–2016)

After not running in 2014, the fourth car returned full-time in 2015 as the No. 19 with Carl Edwards driving. New partner Arris signed on to sponsor 17 races, while Stanley Black & Decker moved from Richard Petty Motorsports to sponsor 12 races. Comcast/Xfinity, Sport Clips, and Edwards' longtime sponsor Subway Restaurants also sponsored the car. Darian Grubb made his return to JGR as Edwards' crew chief. Before the Cup series season, Edwards and JGR were informed that because the No. 19 team was not formed until 2015, they were not eligible for one of the 36 charters NASCAR granted to teams who participated full-time in Cup. Joe Gibbs Racing managed to secure Edwards a spot in every race of the 2016 NASCAR Sprint Cup season by purchasing a charter from the defunct Michael Waltrip Racing. Edwards won his first race with JGR at Charlotte in May. Starting third, he led a total of 25 laps, using fuel mileage strategy to take the victory. He also went on to win at Darlington Raceway and finished the season fifth in points. Edwards would go on to win three races in 2016 and would advance to the championship four. Near the end of the race, Joey Logano would make contact causing Edwards to spin and bring out the caution. He would finish fourth in points.

Daniel Suárez (2017–2018)

On January 11, 2017, Edwards announced that he was stepping away from NASCAR effective immediately, and it was announced that 2016 Xfinity Series champion Daniel Suárez would replace Edwards in the No. 19 car starting at the Daytona 500 in 2017.
Suárez finished 20th in points in his rookie season but lost rookie of the year to teammate Erik Jones. Suárez struggled throughout the 2018 season and finished 21st in points.

Martin Truex Jr. (2019–present)

On November 7, 2018, it was announced that Martin Truex Jr. will replace Suárez in the No. 19 team. In addition, Truex's crew chief Cole Pearn from the defunct Furniture Row Racing will join the team in the 2019 season. Truex Jr. also brought in long-time sponsors Bass Pro Shops and Auto-Owners Insurance to the No. 19 team.

Unlike his new teammates, Truex's 2019 season started on a low when he was caught in "The Big One" at the Daytona 500, finishing 35th. He made five consecutive top-10 finishes and two top-20 finishes before winning his first short track race at Richmond. Truex also scored wins at Dover, Charlotte, and Sonoma. After the season-ending race at Homestead, Truex finished second to Kyle Busch in the 2019 standings.

On December 9, 2019, Pearn announced he parted ways with JGR to pursue opportunities outside the sport. Truex's 2020 season with new crew chief James Small yielded only one win at Martinsville. During the Playoffs, he was eliminated after the Round of 8 and finished seventh in the 2020 standings.

In the 2021 season, Truex scored three wins during the regular season at Phoenix Martinsville and Darlington. In the playoffs Truex scored his fourth win of the season at Richmond and would advance to the final four but in the season finale truex would finish second in the race and points to Kyle Larson.

Truex started the 2022 season with a 13th place finish at the 2022 Daytona 500. He was winless through the regular season, but he stayed consistent with three top-fives and 12 top-10 finishes. Consequently, Truex missed the playoffs after Austin Dillon won the August Daytona race.
He went winless and finished 17th in the final standings.

Truex began the 2023 season by winning the 2023 Busch Light Clash at The Coliseum.

Car No. 19 results

Car No. 20 history

Tony Stewart (1999–2008)

After seven years as a one-car operation, JGR expanded to two cars, bringing in IndyCar champion Tony Stewart. Stewart made his NASCAR Cup debut in the No. 20 Home Depot-sponsored Pontiac Grand Prix at the 1999 Daytona 500, qualifying on the outside pole. He won three races at Richmond, Phoenix, and Homestead, as well as the Winston Open and the NASCAR Rookie of the Year honors and finished fourth in points. 2000 was an up and down year for Stewart as he won six races, including both Dover races, Martinsville, New Hampshire, Michigan, and Homestead but only finished sixth in points. 2001 was another good year for Stewart, as he won the Budweiser Shootout, Richmond, Infineon, and Bristol and finished second in the overall standings.

2002 was a break-out year for Stewart with wins at Atlanta, Richmond, and Watkins Glen along with the Budweiser Shootout and the team won the 2002 points championship. With JGR switching to Chevrolet in 2003, Stewart won twice at Pocono and Charlotte and finished seventh in the points standings. The 2004 season saw Stewart score two wins and finish sixth in points in the first-ever Chase.

Stewart won his second championship in 2005. After winning the Gatorade Duel, the team did not win again until Infineon and then they went on to win the Pepsi 400 at Daytona, followed by New Hampshire, Indianapolis, and Watkins Glen, and held the championship through the Chase.

2006 statistically was Stewart's worst season with JGR. After winning early at Martinsville, he suffered an injury at Charlotte and was replaced during Dover. He won the Pepsi 400 again at Daytona but missed the Chase. During the Chase, Stewart won three races at Kansas, Atlanta, and Texas and finished 11th in points. 2007 was another good year for him and the team. Though Stewart won both the Budweiser Shootout and Gatorade Duel, an early wreck smashed his Daytona 500 hopes. He and the team won three races though at Chicagoland, Indianapolis, and Watkins Glen and finished 6th in points.

Following the team's switch from Chevrolet to Toyota, Stewart's performance dwindled, earning ten top-fives and sixteen top-10s. Stewart's only win for this season was the 2008 AMP Energy 500 at Talladega. On June 9, 2008, Stewart was granted a release from his final year of his contract with Joe Gibbs Racing, ending a twelve-year relationship with the organization that included over 30 wins and two Cup Series Championships. Stewart moved to Haas CNC Racing, renamed Stewart-Haas Racing after he purchased a 50% ownership stake from founder Gene Haas, in part to return to longtime manufacturer Chevrolet.

Joey Logano (2009–2012)

On August 25, 2008, Joe Gibbs Racing announced that 18-year-old Joey Logano would replace Stewart as the driver of the No. 20 car for the 2009 season, after only making his NASCAR debut in May 2008 and running abbreviated Nationwide and Cup schedules. Longtime crew chief Greg Zipadelli remained with JGR for Logano's rookie season. Logano's first win came in the rain-shortened Lenox Industrial Tools 301 at New Hampshire Motor Speedway after a fuel mileage gamble, becoming the youngest winner in Cup Series history. Logano beat former open-wheel drivers Max Papis and Scott Speed for the Rookie of the Year Award, with seven top-tens and a 20th-place points finish. Logano failed to win in 2010 and finished 16th in points.

In 2011, Logano again was winless and finished 24th in points. On October 13, 2011, Joe Gibbs Racing announced The Home Depot will become a co-primary sponsor for Logano's car with Dollar General. Dollar General sponsored 12 races while the other 22 continued to be sponsored by The Home Depot. Logano won his second career race at Pocono from the pole in the 2012 Pocono 400 after passing Mark Martin with three laps to go.

Matt Kenseth (2013–2017)
Beginning in 2013, the No. 20 car was taken over by Matt Kenseth, who left Roush Fenway Racing, as Logano moved to the No. 22 at Team Penske. The team had a resurgence, with Kenseth winning five races in the regular season (Las Vegas, Kansas, Darlington, Kentucky, and Bristol), and led the most laps at several other races (Daytona 500, Kansas, Richmond, and Talladega). Kenseth also won the first two races of the Chase at Chicagoland Speedway and New Hampshire Motor Speedway, bringing the team up to seven wins – which was more wins in a single season than the car had ever achieved with Stewart or Logano.

It was announced in September 2014 that Stanley Black & Decker would leave Richard Petty Motorsports to sponsor JGR in the Cup Series for 2015. This move reunited Kenseth with the DeWalt brand for six races as a primary, and the entire season as an associate.

Kenseth won the Food City 500 in Support of Steve Byrnes And Stand Up To Cancer at Bristol in April, his first victory since 2013. On November 3, he was suspended for two races after intentionally wrecking Logano at Martinsville. Erik Jones was named the replacement driver for Kenseth in both of those races, with Jones finishing 12th and 19th in those races.

In 2016 Kenseth won twice at Dover and New Hampshire and finished 5th in points after he was wrecked while leading at Phoenix by Alex Bowman. Dollar General left the team at the end of the season.

On July 11, 2017, JGR announced that Jones would replace Kenseth in the No. 20 car in 2018. Like his JGR teammates, Kenseth was hampered by bad luck and lack of speed at the beginning of the year. He scored his final win with Joe Gibbs Racing at Phoenix in November after passing Chase Elliott late in the race.

Erik Jones (2018–2020)

In 2018, Jones claimed his first career Cup win at the Coke Zero Sugar 400 at Daytona and made it to the Playoffs until he was eliminated after the Bank of America Roval 400 at Charlotte. Jones finished the season 15th in points.

Jones started the 2019 season by finishing third at the Daytona 500, behind teammates Denny Hamlin and Kyle Busch. On September 2, 2019, Jones scored his second career Cup Series win at Darlington, securing him in the 2019 Playoffs. During the playoffs, Jones finished fourth at Richmond, but was disqualified when his car was discovered to have a rear wheel alignment issue during post-race inspection. He once again was eliminated after the Bank of America Roval at Charlotte due to a multi-car incident that punctured his radiator.

Jones kicked off 2020 by winning the Busch Clash; despite being involved in three accidents towards the end of the race, further wrecks among the field led to multiple overtime attempts. On the third overtime, Jones received a push from Hamlin on the final lap to win. On May 18, 2020, following the 2020 The Real Heroes 400 at Darlington, crew chief Chris Gayle was suspended for one race and fined 20,000 after it was discovered that two lug nuts were not safely secured during post-race inspection. Race engineer Seth Chavka was announced to take over Gayle's duties at the 2020 Toyota 500 at Darlington. Jones missed the Playoffs, went winless, and finished 17th in the final standings.

Christopher Bell (2021–present)

On August 6, 2020, it was confirmed that Erik Jones would not be returning to the No. 20 car in 2021. Four days later, Christopher Bell was announced as Jones' replacement. On February 21, 2021, Bell passed Joey Logano with two laps remaining at the Daytona Road Course and scored his first career victory with the team, the first time the No. 20 car returned to victory lane since the 2019 Bojangles' Southern 500 with Jones behind the wheel, 48 races ago. During the playoffs, Bell made it to the Round of 12, but struggled with a poor finish at Las Vegas, yet he rebounded with a fifth-place finish at Talladega. Following the Charlotte Roval race, he was eliminated from the Round of 8.

Bell started the 2022 season with a 34th place finish at the 2022 Daytona 500. He scored a win at New Hampshire to become the 14th different winner of the season. During the playoffs, Bell won at the Charlotte Roval to advance to the Round of 8. At Las Vegas, Bell got caught between a wreck involving Kyle Larson and Bubba Wallace, resulting in a 34th place finish. Bell won at Martinsville to make the Championship 4. He finished 10th at the Phoenix finale and a career-best third in the points standings.

Car No. 20 results

Car No. 18, 54 history

Dale Jarrett (1992–1994)
Joe Gibbs Racing debuted at the 1992 Daytona 500 with second-generation driver Dale Jarrett driving the No. 18 Interstate Batteries-sponsored Chevrolet Lumina to a 36th-place finish after a crash. The team improved dramatically the next year when Jarrett won the Daytona 500 and finished a then career-high 4th in points. Jarrett won a race at Charlotte but he slipped to 16th in points in 1994 and moved to Robert Yates Racing's famed 28 car for 1995.

Bobby Labonte (1995–2005)

The team replaced Jarrett with Bobby Labonte, younger brother of Terry Labonte and 1993 Rookie of the Year runner-up. In 1995, Labonte won 3 races, sweeping both Michigan events and winning at Charlotte, finishing 10th in points. This would mark the beginning of a decade of success between Labonte, Joe Gibbs Racing, and Interstate Batteries. In 1996 the team struggled to win until the season finale at Atlanta and finished 11th in points. In 1997 the team had a similar year to the previous but managed to improve to 7th in points. Their lone win came at the season finale. The team improved in 1998 by winning races at Atlanta and Talladega en route to 6th place in points.

1999 was a breakout year for the No. 18 team. They scored 5 wins which came at Dover, Michigan, Atlanta and both races at Pocono. The team came just short of the championship and finished 2nd in points to Jarrett, once again at Atlanta. The team continued their success in the next season, winning the second race of the season at Rockingham. Labonte's next win was the Brickyard 400 at the famed Indianapolis Motor Speedway. His third win came at the Southern 500 at Darlington recovering from a hard practice crash and taking the lead on a late race pit stop to win the rain and darkness shortened event. His fourth and final win of the year came at Charlotte a month later. Labonte would hold the points lead for 25 consecutive races to win the 2000 NASCAR Winston Cup Series Championship.

The team faced disappointment in 2001 after high expectations following the championship season, winning only 2 races at Pocono and Atlanta and finishing 6th in points. 2002 was the team's worst year since Labonte joined the team, scoring only one win at Martinsville and finishing a disappointing 16th in points. The team rebounded in 2003 scoring 2 wins at Atlanta and Homestead to finish 8th in points. Even though the team made some progression in 2004, the team fired crew chief Michael "Fatback" McSwain midseason, with Brandon Thomas taking over for the rest of the year. The team went winless to finish 12th in points. Steve Addington, a Gibbs Busch Series crew chief, was named new crew chief for the 2005 season, but a rash of troubles, some caused by mechanical problems, continued to daunt the team. The high point of the year was the Coca-Cola 600 when he finished second to Jimmie Johnson by half a car length. Labonte finished 24th in the championship standings, and the team's regression led to his departure following the end of 2005. Bobby Labonte earned all 21 of his career Cup Series wins in the car, as well as the Winston Cup championship in 2000. He would depart for the 43 car of Petty Enterprises.

J. J. Yeley (2006–2007)
After Labonte's departure, Gibbs announced that JGR Busch Series driver and former USAC standout J. J. Yeley would replace him in the No. 18 for 2006, joining fellow rookie teammate Denny Hamlin. Yeley had a dismal rookie season with only three top tens while failing to finish seven races, leading to 29th-place points finish. Yeley's sophomore campaign was only slightly better, earning a pole at Michigan and scoring three more top tens to finish 21st in points. Yeley moved to JGR-affiliated Hall of Fame Racing for 2008.

Kyle Busch (2008–2022)

On August 14, 2007, it was announced that 22-year-old Kyle Busch had signed a contract to drive the number 18 with Joe Gibbs Racing through 2010, leaving Hendrick Motorsports' number 5 car after a successful but controversial tenure with the organization. Mars, Incorporated's M&M's brand was signed as the team's primary sponsor, leaving Robert Yates Racing, while longtime partner Interstate Batteries scaled down to be a secondary sponsor and six race primary sponsor. Joe Gibbs racing also left General Motors in favor of becoming Toyota's highest-profile team. Busch gave Toyota its first Cup win on March 9, 2008, leading a race-high 173 laps to win the Kobalt Tools 500 at Atlanta Motor Speedway. In his first year in the 18, Busch had brought the car back to its former glory, winning 7 additional races (Talladega, Darlington, Dover, Infineon, Daytona, Chicagoland, and Watkins Glen) and would finish tenth in points.

In 2009, Busch opened the season by winning his Gatorade Duel qualifying race but finished 41st in the race after a crash. He won the third race of the season from the pole at Las Vegas, and scored additional wins at Richmond and both Bristol races, but failed to qualify for the Chase by only 8 points. As a result, longtime JGR crew chief Steve Addington was fired near the end of the season and coincidentally went to crew chief for Kyle's brother Kurt Busch at Penske Racing. Dave Rogers, Busch's Nationwide Series crew chief, took over the pit box in 2010. The year produced 3 victories at Richmond, Dover, and Bristol, but more struggles in the final 10 races led to an 8th-place finish in the standings. 2011 was an up and down year for the 18 team. The team won at Bristol and Richmond early in the season, as well as the inaugural Cup race at Kentucky and the August race at Michigan. At Texas Motor Speedway in November, Busch was parked by NASCAR for the remainder of the race weekend after intentionally spinning out Ron Hornaday in the Truck Series race. Michael McDowell would replace Busch that weekend, finishing a dismal 33rd. Mars, Inc proceeded to pull its sponsorship for the final two races, with Interstate Batteries covering those races. Busch was relegated to twelfth in the final standings.

In 2012, Busch won the Budweiser Shootout to open the season and scored a single points-paying victory, the spring race at Richmond. He would miss making the Chase for the Sprint Cup by 3 points, but scored 7 top 5 and 8 top 10 finishes during the final ten races, finishing the year in 13th place and nearly 100 points ahead of 14th place Ryan Newman. In 2013, Busch won the second Budweiser Duel qualifying race, and won the pole at the spring Bristol race, finishing second. He also swept the spring Fontana and Texas race weekends, winning the Nationwide and Cup races, giving Joe Gibbs his first win at Fontana in Sprint Cup competition and first win for himself at Texas. He would win at Watkins Glen and Atlanta. Busch's four wins and career-high 22 top ten finishes would lead to a fourth-place finish in the championship, the highest of his career. In 2014, Busch earned a spot in the new Chase for the Sprint Cup with his early-season win at Fontana. Busch would be eliminated in the second round, after being swept up in a wreck at Talladega, and would finish tenth in points.

For 2015, sponsor Mars, Inc. introduced a new green paint scheme to promote Crispy M&M's on the 18 car. After an injury to Kyle Busch in the season-opening Xfinity Series race, the No. 18 started the 2015 season with two-time Truck Series champion Matt Crafton making his Sprint Cup debut at the 2015 Daytona 500, finishing 18th. The next week, David Ragan was announced as interim driver, moving from his full-time ride at Front Row Motorsports. Ragan drove the car for nine races through Talladega and scored a single top-five finish at Martinsville, before moving to Michael Waltrip Racing. Development driver Erik Jones, who drove for Busch in the Truck Series, made his first series start at Kansas. Jones ran in the top ten for much of the race, before crashing on the front stretch and finishing 40th. After missing a total of 11 races, Busch returned to the car for the Sprint All-Star Race at Charlotte, receiving a waiver from NASCAR to be eligible for the Chase for the Sprint Cup provided he win a race and gain a top 30 position in the championship standings. At Sonoma in June, his fifth start of the year, Busch scored his first victory of the season. It was also the first time he and his brother Kurt Busch had finished first and second in any Cup Series event. Busch would then win three consecutive races – Kentucky, New Hampshire, and Indianapolis – with four total wins across a five-race span. The latter victory was also Busch's first Brickyard 400 victory, the first for manufacturer Toyota, and marked the first time a driver swept both the Cup and Xfinity races at Indianapolis. Busch would go on to make the 2015 Chase for the Sprint Cup. At the second Phoenix race, Busch would be one of the four drivers going to Homestead-Miami Speedway with an opportunity to win the Sprint Cup championship after the race was stopped by NASCAR due to rain. The following weekend at Homestead-Miami Speedway, Busch would go on to win the race as well as his first Sprint Cup title.  He and brother Kurt join Bobby and Terry Labonte as the only brothers in NASCAR's top series to win championships. This was the 2nd championship for the No. 18 car. Busch ended the season with 5 wins, 12 top fives, and 16 top tens in only 25 starts. It was the first championship for manufacturer Toyota and fourth for team owner Joe Gibbs.

On May 13, 2016, JGR announced that Busch would drive the number 75 car at the All-Star race only, to celebrate M&Ms 75th anniversary.

Busch ended 2016 with four wins, made the Championship 4, and finished third in the final standings.

In 2017, Busch was hampered by bad luck, especially at the beginning of the season as JGR was also having trouble finding speed. However, he picked up steam late in the season and won five races starting at the second Pocono race, a week after being wrecked while leading at Indianapolis. Busch made the Championship 4 again by winning at Martinsville and finished second to Martin Truex Jr. in both the Homestead race and the final standings.

In 2018, Busch had possibly his best season in the cup series, scoring eight wins including three in a row at Texas, Bristol, and Richmond. He also dominated the 2018 Coca-Cola 600 at Charlotte, becoming the first driver to win all four stages. Busch's fifth win came at Chicagoland, where he used a bump and run to beat Kyle Larson on the last lap. His sixth win was the second Pocono race where he beat teammate Daniel Suárez on several late restarts. Busch also won the fall Richmond race to sweep the 2018 Richmond races. His last win was the penultimate race at Phoenix, which clinched his spot in the Championship 4. Unfortunately, at Homestead, his car was noticeably slower than his three competitors for the championship and he finished fourth in the race and the final standings.

Busch started the 2019 season by finishing second at the Daytona 500, behind teammate Denny Hamlin. He had consistent top-10 finishes at Atlanta and Las Vegas before scoring his first win of the season at Phoenix. Busch also won at California and Bristol to maintain his points lead. Following the 2019 Bojangles' Southern 500 at Darlington Raceway, Busch clinched his second consecutive Regular Season Championship. Busch also won the 2019 Ford Ecoboost 400 clinching his second Monster energy NASCAR Cup series title.

Busch started the 2020 season with a 34th place finish at the Daytona 500. Before the Las Vegas race, the team was docked 10 driver and owner points for an L1 level penalty during pre-race inspection. Busch finished the regular season winless, but stayed consistent enough to make the playoffs. A series of bad finishes at Talladega and the Charlotte Roval resulted in him being eliminated from the round of 8. Despite no longer being a championship factor, Busch won at Texas and finished the season eighth in points. Following the season, Xfinity Series crew chief Ben Beshore replaced Stevens, who was transferred to the No. 20 team driven by Christopher Bell.

After only winning just one race in 2020, Busch opened the 2021 season by winning the Busch Clash on a last-lap pass. Ryan Blaney was leading and Chase Elliott was in second when the two collided on the front-stretch chicane which led to Busch passing both to win his second Busch Clash. He also scored two wins at Kansas and Pocono to make the playoffs. After crashing at the 2021 Cook Out Southern 500, a frustrated Busch ran over several safety cones and nearly hit some people on his way to the garage, landing him a $50,000 fine.

On December 20, 2021, Mars, Inc. announced that it will leave NASCAR following the 2022 season.

Busch started the 2022 season with a second place finish at the 2022 Busch Light Clash at The Coliseum, losing to Joey Logano after leading 65 of the exhibition race's 150 laps. He finished sixth at the 2022 Daytona 500. Busch won the Bristol dirt race after Tyler Reddick and Chase Briscoe collided with each other for the lead on the final lap. His run at Darlington ended abruptly when Brad Keselowski blew a tire and collided with him. Busch parked his car on pit road and walked off when its front suspension was too damaged for it to return to the garage. Busch finished second at Pocono, but was disqualified and the No. 18 team was served an L1 penalty after a post-race inspection revealed an alteration to the car's front fascia. It was revealed that the lower corners and wheel openings of the front fascia were wrapped with a layer of clear vinyl that was not removed prior to the application of the paint scheme wrap, resulting in a slight irregularity in the car's dimensions. At the Southern 500, Busch led a race-best 155 laps before his engine expired during the final caution, resulting in a 30th place finish. Busch was eliminated in the Round of 16 after another engine failure at the Bristol night race. On October 18, Beshore was suspended for four races for a loose wheel violation at Las Vegas.

Ty Gibbs (2023–present)

After JGR and Toyota failed to secure a replacement for Mars, it was reported that Busch would depart from the team and manufacturer after 15 seasons. On September 13, 2022, Busch announced that he had signed with Richard Childress Racing to drive the No. 8 in 2023, returning to Chevrolet for the first time since 2007, and brought Kyle Busch Motorsports with him. The No. 18 was then replaced by the No. 54 in 2023, with Ty Gibbs as the driver.

Car No. 54 results

NASCAR Xfinity Series

Car No. 11 history

Brian Scott (2011–2012)
The No. 11 team began racing in 2011. JGR signed 22-year-old Brian Scott (former driver of the No. 11 with Braun Racing) to a two-year contract, with Kevin Kidd announced as the crew chief, and Scott bringing sponsorship from his family-owned Shore Lodge. The new team was constantly hampered by bad luck during races, with 5 DNF's on the season. Scott earned a pole, two top 5s and seven top 10s, finishing 8th in points. For 2012, Dollar General expanded its sponsorship deal with JGR, sponsoring the No. 11 car for the full season. Despite showing speed, the team continued to struggle finishing races (7 DNF's), and had a best finish of 3rd at Dover, with Scott finishing 9th in points.

Elliott Sadler (2013–2014)

In 2013, Scott was replaced by veteran Elliott Sadler, who finished second in the championship standings in the two prior seasons. Sadler brought sponsorship from OneMain Financial with him from Richard Childress Racing. After winning four races in 2012, Sadler went winless in 2013, though he did score 20 top 10s en route to a fourth-place points finish. Sadler scored his first win for JGR at Talladega in 2014, leading a race high 40 laps. On October 31, 2014, it was announced that Sadler would depart for Roush Fenway Racing's Nationwide program, taking the OneMain sponsorship with him. The team's points and crew were moved to the No. 18 for the 2015 season, and the number was reassigned in 2016 to Kaulig Racing for Blake Koch.

Car No. 11 results

Car No. 18 history
Part-time with Tony Stewart and Bobby Labonte (1998)
The current 18 car came under JGR control when owner Joe Gibbs purchased the No. 44 Shell Oil-sponsored Pontiac from his Cup Series driver Bobby Labonte, who had been operating the team under his control. The team made its debut under the Gibbs banner at the 1998 NAPA Auto Parts 300 with then-IndyCar driver Tony Stewart driving. Stewart, he qualified 9th but finished 31st after a crash. At the next week at Rockingham Speedway, Stewart qualified on the pole, led 60 laps, and finished 2nd. Stewart ran a total of 22 races that year, with five top-five finishes and winning two pole positions. Labonte ran five races that year in that car in 1998, winning the Diamond Hill Plywood 200.

Part-time (1999)
The team switched to No. 18 with sponsorship from MBNA for 1999. Labonte ran only one race before he suffered shoulder injuries in a qualifying crash at Darlington. Late in the year, Jason Leffler, like Stewart an accomplished open wheel racer, ran four races in the car that year, his best finish being a 20th at Memphis Motorsports Park. 

Jason Leffler (2000)
Leffler ran the car full-time in 2000, winning a pole at Texas Motor Speedway, and posting three top-ten finishes. After that season, he left for the Cup Series with Chip Ganassi Racing, and Jeff Purvis took his place.

Jeff Purvis and Mike McLaughlin (2001)
Purvis started strong and was seventh in points but was released after the GNC Live Well 250 because of sponsorship issues. Mike McLaughlin replaced him, finishing seventh in points that season. 

Mike McLaughlin (2002)
McLaughlin returned for 2002, and despite going winless in 2002, he moved up to fourth place in points. However, owner Joe Gibbs wanted his son Coy in a full-time ride, leaving McLaughlin without a ride. 

Coy Gibbs (2003)
In his rookie season, The now late Coy Gibbs drove the No. 18 full time in 2003. Gibbs had two Top 10 finishes and finished runner-up to David Stremme for Rookie of the Year.

Part-time (2004)
The team scaled back to a part-time schedule for 2004. In November 2003, JGR signed highly touted USAC Champion J. J. Yeley to a multi-year contract, beginning his stock car career with eight ARCA Menards Series events and 10-12 Busch Series races in the 2004 season. The Home Depot's Vigoro Lawn and Garden Products would sponsor Yeley's efforts, making their BGN debut at Las Vegas in March. In his first race, Yeley qualified a strong seventh, but finished 23rd and two laps down. Yeley would end up running 17 races, garnering four Top 10 finishes and finishing fourth in Rookie of the Year standings behind future Cup drivers Kyle Busch, Clint Bowyer, and Paul Menard. Bobby Labonte ran two races with a best finish of 7th, while Denny Hamlin finished a strong sixth at the fall race at Darlington. 

J. J. Yeley (2005–2006)
Yeley ran the car full-time in 2005, finishing in the top-ten twelve times and finishing 11th in points. Yeley continued to run full-time in 2006, finishing 5th in the points standings with three poles, nine Top 5s, 22 Top 10s, and 27 Top 15s. Yeley announced in Daytona that he would be driving in the No. 1 Miccosukee Gaming and Resorts-sponsored Chevrolet for Phoenix Racing in the 2007 NASCAR Busch Series.

Multiple drivers (2007)
In January 2007, former Brewco Motorsports development driver and ARCA standout Brad Coleman signed to drive the No. 18 car for 17 of the 35 races, with Carino's Italian Grill sponsoring his efforts. Kevin Conway was signed for eight races beginning at Bristol in March with Z-Line Designs sponsoring, while Tony Stewart and development driver Aric Almirola filled out the schedule with Goody's Headache Powder and ConAgra Foods sponsorships. Almirola put the car on the pole at the season opener at Daytona, and had a best finish of 4th at Charlotte. Coleman earned his first career Busch Series pole at Talladega, and had three Top 5s and five Top 10s. Without sponsorship for a full-time ride with JGR, Coleman returned to the renamed Baker Curb Racing following the season and signed a development contract with Hall of Fame Racing.

Part-time (2008)
For 2008, the No. 18 was piloted by the team of Denny Hamlin and Kyle Busch with sponsorship coming from Southern Farm Bureau, Interstate Batteries, and Z-Line Designs. Despite running a partial schedule, Busch won ten races in 2008, including eight in the No. 18, and would finish sixth in points while Hamlin scored a single victory in the No. 18 at Dover. 18-year-old JGR development driver Marc Davis made his one and only national series start for the team in October at Memphis Motorsports Park with DLP HDTV sponsoring.

Kyle Busch (2009)
In 2009, Kyle Busch went full time in the Nationwide Series, driving the No. 18 Z-Line Designs / NOS Toyota. Busch won 9 races and won the 2009 NASCAR Nationwide Series Title.

Multiple drivers (2010–2013)
In 2010, Kyle Busch ran most of the races that were paired with Sprint Cup Series races, while Brad Coleman returned to run the stand-alone races. For 2011, Busch drove the No. 18 for a majority of the season, splitting the ride with Michael McDowell, who ran both Iowa races, Lucas Oil Raceway, and the road courses Road America and Circuit Gilles Villeneuve with sponsorship from Pizza Ranch. McDowell won the pole at Road America and dominated until late-race contact with another car. Drivers Kelly Bires, Drew Herring, and Joey Logano also took turns in the No. 18. Bires ran at Richmond and Chicago with International Comfort Products Corporation, Herring drove at the second Nashville race with Sport Clips, and Logano drove the No. 18 at Chicago, Dover, Kansas, and Phoenix. For 2012, the No. 18 would have a similar lineup, featuring Hamlin, Logano, Herring, McDowell, and Ryan Truex. Logano would take seven victories with the No. 18 team, handing the team the Nationwide Owners' Championship. For 2013, the No. 18 and 20 teams swapped. Matt Kenseth drove the No. 18 for 16 races with sponsorship from Reser's Fine Foods and GameStop. He won the July race at Daytona and the October race at Kansas. The No. 18 car did not run in 2014.

Daniel Suárez (2015)

On August 19, 2014, JGR announced that Toyota Series and K&N Pro Series East driver Daniel Suárez would drive the No. 18 full-time in 2015 with a sponsorship from Arris, running for Rookie of the Year. Suárez had a strong rookie season, earning eight top fives, 18 top tens, and three poles to finish fifth in points and beat out Darrell Wallace Jr. for Rookie of the Year.

Multiple drivers (2016–2019)

The team inherited the No. 54's points and equipment in 2016, fielding multiple drivers, starting with former JGR driver Bobby Labonte at Daytona. Kyle Busch drove a limited schedule, with former sponsor NOS Energy Drink (owned by Monster Beverage) funding both Busch and Labonte's efforts. Matt Tifft was scheduled to drive 13 races for the team, but was replaced for several races as he recovered from a removal of a tumor in his brain. Sam Hornish Jr. replaced Tifft for the June Xfinity race at Iowa, and won the race. David Ragan ran the July Xfinity race at Daytona, and won the pole, and was in contention for the win, but crashed on the final lap of the race. Road course specialist Owen Kelly ran the road course races at Mid-Ohio and Road America, and Dakoda Armstrong ran the July Xfinity race at Iowa. The No. 18 car won 12 races in 2016, ten with Busch, one at Charlotte with Hamlin, and one with Hornish at Iowa.

For 2017, multiple drivers again raced in the No. 18. Daniel Suárez drove 12 races beginning at Daytona in February with sponsorship from Juniper. Kyle Busch drove 10 races with sponsor NOS Energy Drink beginning at Atlanta in March, winning 5 races at Atlanta, Kentucky, Loudon, Watkins Glen, and Bristol. Kyle Busch Motorsports driver Christopher Bell made his Xfinity Series debut with the No. 18 team at Charlotte, finishing 4th. Bell would also drive the car at Road America, Kansas, Texas, and Phoenix. Bell won the race at Kansas after catching and passing teammate Erik Jones for his first career Xfinity Series win in his 5th start. Bell had sponsorship from SiriusXM at Charlotte, Toyotacare at Road America, JBL at Kansas, and Safelite at Texas and Phoenix. ARCA driver Kyle Benjamin drove the No. 18 with sponsorship from Reser's Fine Foods and Sport Clips at both Iowa races and Kentucky in September with a best finish of 2nd at the July Iowa race to teammate Ryan Preece. Regan Smith returned to the Xfinity series in a one-race deal in the No. 18 at Mid-Ohio with sponsorship from Interstate Batteries. Denny Hamlin also drove one race in the No. 18, running a throwback scheme at Darlington with Sport Clips sponsoring, Hamlin won the race. Ryan Preece drove the No. 18 car at Homestead with Safelite as the sponsor and finished 5th in preparation for an expanded ten–race schedule with the team in 2018. Preece shared the car with JGR’s cup series drivers Busch, Suárez, Hamlin, and Jones in 2018. Preece would go on to win at Bristol.

In 2019, Busch returned for seven races with Hamlin running the Darlington race. Jeffrey Earnhardt was signed to nine races while the rest of the schedule was filled out by development drivers Harrison Burton and Riley Herbst. On August 7, 2019, Earnhardt announced that he parted ways with sponsor and XCI affiliate iK9, as well as Joe Gibbs Racing. Jack Hawksworth would drive the car at Mid-Ohio.

Riley Herbst (2020)

For 2020, Riley Herbst will be driving this car full-time. Dave Rogers will serve as crew chief. He qualified for the playoffs but was eliminated following the first round and ultimately finished 12th in the standings.

Daniel Hemric (2021)

On November 12, 2020, it was confirmed that Daniel Hemric would replace Riley Herbst for the 2021 season. On September 25, 2021, it was confirmed that Hemric would not be returning to the team after the 2021 season, moving to Kaulig Racing's No. 11 in 2022 as the replacement for Justin Haley's Xfinity seat. Despite being winless during the regular season, Hemric used his consistency to advance to the Championship 4 at Phoenix where he finally won his first career Xfinity race as well as the Championship.

Multiple drivers (2022)
In 2022, JGR downsized to three teams including the No. 18, No. 19, and No. 54. Drivers such as Drew Dollar, Trevor Bayne, Ryan Truex, John Hunter Nemechek, and Sammy Smith drove the No. 18. The team would go winless in 2022.

Sammy Smith (2023–present)
On December 6, 2022, Joe Gibbs Racing announced that Sammy Smith would drive the No. 18 full-time in 2023 with sponsorship from Pilot Flying J. During the season, Smith scored his first win at Phoenix; at age 18, he became the youngest Xfinity Series winner.

Car No. 19 history

Part-time (2004–2006)
The No. 19 team was to make its debut at the 2004 Michigan race driven by Bobby Labonte and sponsored by Banquet Foods, however, qualifying was rained out and the team with no owner's points missed the race. The team finally made its first start in 2005 CarQuest Auto Parts 300. Labonte ran seven races that year, with three top-tens. With Labonte moving to Petty Enterprises, JGR development driver Aric Almirola ran the car in seven races in 2006. Tony Stewart also drove the car at select races in 2006, using his NEXTEL Cup crew when he raced. The No. 19 team was disbanded after the 2006 season.

Daniel Suárez (2016)

The No. 19 car was returned for 2016 with Daniel Suárez and sponsor Arris moving from the 18 team, maintaining the same sponsor-number combination used by Carl Edwards in the Cup Series. Suárez got his first win at Michigan after a last lap pass to Kyle Busch. Suárez scored three victories and won the 2016 championship, becoming the first foreign-born driver to win a NASCAR National championship.

Matt Tifft (2017)

It was announced that in 2017, Matt Tifft would drive full-time in the 19, with rookie crew chief Matt Beckham on the box. Tifft struggled to repeat the success of Suárez failing to win any races and finishing 7th in points.

Brandon Jones (2018–2022)

On November 15, 2017, JGR announced that Brandon Jones would replace Tifft in the 19 in 2018. Tifft would move to Richard Childress Racing in a driver swap. Chris Gabehart was announced as his crew chief, moving from the No. 20 Xfinity team and replacing Matt Beckham. From 2018 to 2022, Jones score five wins and made the top-10 in the playoffs. On September 14, 2022, Jones announced he would leave JGR at the end of the 2022 season and move to the JR Motorsports No. 9 in 2023.

Multiple Drivers (2023–present)
On December 8, 2022, Joe Gibbs Racing announced that the No. 19 car would run full time with a number of drivers, including Ryan Truex and Joe Graf Jr..

Car No. 20 history

Early years (2000–2002)
After JGR purchased the team from Gary Bechtel in 2000, the team received sponsorship from Porter-Cable. Despite missing three races, driver Jeff Purvis had eleven Top 10s and one pole, finishing 11th in points. The team switched to No. 20 for 2001, and Mike McLaughlin was named the driver. Without a major sponsor, McLaughlin was able to win the Subway 300 and was sixth in points when Gibbs decided to shut down his team due to sponsorship problems. He moved to the No. 18 and finished seventh in points that year. Coy Gibbs ran five races in the No. 20 in 2002, with a sponsorship from ConAgra Foods. His best finish was a 14th at Kentucky Speedway.

Mike Bliss (2003–2004)
After he moved to the 18, Gibbs was replaced by Mike Bliss and Rockwell Automation came aboard as a sponsor. Bliss had fourteen Top 10s and finished 10th in points. In 2004, he pulled off a win at Lowe's Motor Speedway and had three poles.

Denny Hamlin (2005–2008)
In 2005, Denny Hamlin came aboard and posted eleven Top 10s and finished fifth points, the third-place finisher in rookie points. He ran the full schedule in the No. 20 in 2006, winning two races and finishing fourth in points.

Hamlin and developmental driver Aric Almirola split duties in the No. 20 in 2007 with sponsorship from Rockwell Automation, with Tony Stewart also piloting the No. 20 at Atlanta. With Hamlin running several non-companion races, Almirola would occasionally qualify the car that Hamlin would later drive. Hamlin took the car to victory lane in four races, including Darlington, Milwaukee, Michigan, and Dover. The win at Milwaukee was controversial, with Almirola putting the car on the pole and starting the race because Hamlin was delayed flying from Sonoma Raceway. Almirola started the car and led the first 43 laps but was still relieved by Hamlin during a caution due to obligations to his sponsorship from Rockwell. Almirola was credited as the winner for starting the race but did not participate in the victory celebration. He would leave JGR after the season. The No. 20 finished 2nd in the owners points behind RCR's No. 29.

Cup Drivers (2008–2012)

In 2008, the No. 20 was shared by Hamlin, Kyle Busch, and Stewart for nine races before defending NASCAR Camping World East Series champion Joey Logano was named the driver of the No. 20 for the rest of the season's races except for Loudon (which Stewart won in the No. 20), Daytona (which Hamlin won in the No. 20), and Chicago (which Busch won in the No. 18). All four drivers of the No. 20 won races driving it in 2008. For 2009, 20-year-old Brad Coleman returned to JGR for a part-time schedule, sharing the ride with Logano and Hamlin. In 2010, Joey Logano, Denny Hamlin, and Matt DiBenedetto shared the No. 20 car, with Hamlin winning at Darlington and Logano winning at Kentucky and Kansas. For 2011, Logano returned to the No. 20 with sponsorships from GameStop and Sport Clips. Logano ran the first 10 races but picked up last-minute sponsorship from Harvest Investments to run Nashville. Due to a lack of sponsorship, the No. 20 was unable to run a full schedule for the owner's championship. In the 20, Logano grabbed his first superspeedway win at the July Daytona race with help from Kyle Busch. The No. 20 was also driven by Denny Hamlin at Las Vegas, Richmond, and Darlington, with Hamlin winning at Richmond. Drew Herring drove the No. 20 with Sport Clips at both Iowa races, where Herring won the pole for the May race, and Lucas Oil Raceway. Ryan Truex stepped into the No. 20 late in the season for six races, finishing second to Logano at Dover after dominating the race.

The No. 20 team returned in 2012 to run most of the season. Its primary driver lineup consisted of Logano, Hamlin, Truex, and JGR development driver Darrell Wallace Jr. Michael Waltrip Racing driver Clint Bowyer also drove the No. 20 at Daytona when Hamlin was sidelined from the race by back problems.

Brian Vickers (2013)
Starting in the 2013 season, 2003 Busch Series Champion Brian Vickers joined the team driving the No. 20 for the full season with sponsorship from Dollar General, in addition to a partial Sprint Cup Series schedule in Michael Waltrip Racing's 55 car. Dollar General had sponsored Vickers in the past with Braun Racing, and like teammate Elliott Sadler, Vickers was attempting to reclaim his career in the second-tier series. After 30 starts, Vickers was sidelined with a second incidence of blood clots, replaced by Denny Hamlin and Drew Herring in the final three races of the season. Though he went winless, Vickers scored 13 top 5s and 18 top 10s to finish 10th in points. He would leave for a full-time ride at MWR at the end of the year.

Multiple Drivers (2014)
The No. 20 team continued to run full-time in 2014. Matt Kenseth drove the No. 20 in a total of 18 races, with GameStop sponsoring 10 races and Reser's Fine Foods sponsoring 7 races. Sam Hornish Jr. and Kenseth each ran 1 race and Kenny Habul 2 races with Habul's Sun Energy 1 sponsoring. Darrell Wallace Jr. ran at Talladega in the spring with ToyotaCare and Daytona in July with Coca-Cola "Share a Coke". Daniel Suárez made his debut at RIR, finishing 19th. Michael McDowell ran at both Iowa races with Pizza Ranch. Denny Hamlin returned to the No. 20 at Chicagoland in September with Sport Clips, finishing 32nd after a blown engine. Development driver Justin Boston, running the full ARCA schedule, made his debut in the No. 20 at Kentucky later in the month, with sponsor Zloop E-Recycling. Kenseth scored a win in the final race of the season at Homestead Miami Speedway, and the No. 20 would finish 9th in owners points.

Erik Jones (2015–2017)
Erik Jones was scheduled to run a limited schedule in the No. 20 car in 2015, with Kenny Habul and SunEnergy1 also returning for the three road courses. Jones, whose schedule was expanded due to Kyle Busch's injury, scored his first Xfinity win in his 9th career start at Texas in April, leading a race-high 79 laps. Ross Kenseth, son of Sprint Cup Series champion Matt Kenseth, made his Xfinity Series debut at Chicagoland Speedway on June 20. David Ragan made a single start at Daytona in July with Interstate Batteries sponsorship. Kenny Wallace made his final career start in the No. 20 car at Iowa Speedway in August, with longtime sponsor U.S. Cellular. Wallace started seventh and finished 15th. Matt Tifft made his Xfinity Series debut at Kentucky in September, finishing 10th. Denny Hamlin drove a total of six races in the 20; two with SunEnergy 1 sponsorship, three with Hisense, and running a throwback scheme at Darlington in September with Sport Clips sponsoring. Hamlin scored three wins, all of which were from the pole starting position. Matt Kenseth ran five races with Reser's Fine Foods, scoring four-second-place finishes.

Erik Jones drove the car full-time in 2016, with Gamestop, Reser's, Hisense, Interstate Batteries and Dewalt as the sponsors.
Jones won 4 times but finished 4th in points after getting trapped behind the slow car of Cole Whitt on the last restart of the final race at Homestead.

In 2017, the No. 20 was driven by a variety of different drivers. Denny Hamlin, Erik Jones, Kyle Benjamin, Christopher Bell, Daniel Suarez, James Davison and Ryan Preece are among them. Jones drove the car for 18 races starting at Daytona, sweeping the Texas races as well as winning the Bristol spring race. Hamlin drove the car for three races and won at Michigan. Suárez drove the No. 20 for two races at Las Vegas and the Bristol fall race, finishing 3rd and 2nd respectively. Benjamin drove the car for two races at the spring Richmond race and the first Pocono race, winning the pole in the latter. Bell drove the No. 20 for three races starting at the June Iowa race, where Bell won stage one, led the most laps, but finished 16th after being collected in a crash between the lapped cars of Brennan Poole and Ryan Reed while leading. Ryan Preece drove the car at Loudon, the July Iowa race, and the September Kentucky race. Preece finished 2nd to his teammate Kyle Busch at Loudon. In his next race at Iowa, Preece led the most laps and won the race, then finished 4th at Kentucky. James Davison drove the No. 20 at Mid Ohio and Road America, leading the most laps at Road America before getting collected in a wreck.

Christopher Bell (2017–2019)

For 2018, Christopher Bell drove the No. 20 full-time, competing for Rookie of the Year honors. Jason Ratcliff was his crew chief, moving from the No. 20 cup series team. Bell won seven races in 2018, breaking the record for a rookie in the series previously held by Greg Biffle and Kyle Busch. He made it to the Championship 4 but had a tire go down at Homestead and finished 13th in the race and 4th among the championship contenders. He returned for the full 2019 season.

Harrison Burton (2020–2021)

In 2020 and 2021, Harrison Burton drove for Joe Gibbs Racing full-time in their No. 20 Toyota, replacing Christopher Bell, who moved up to the NASCAR Cup Series while also competing for Rookie of the Year honors. Ben Beshore served as crew chief, moving from the No. 18 Xfinity Series team. During the 2020 season, Burton won his first four races at Fontana, Homestead, Texas, and Martinsville and finished eighth in the final standings. On July 15, 2021, it was announced that Burton would leave JGR to drive the Wood Brothers Racing No. 21 in the Cup Series for Wood Brothers in 2022. Despite not winning a race throughout 2021, Burton once again made the playoffs with his consistency and finished 8th in the final standings. Following the end of the 2022 season, JGR shut down the No. 20 team and downsized its Xfinity program to three teams: The Nos. 18, 19, and 54.

John Hunter Nemechek (2023–present)
On December 8, 2022, it was announced that John Hunter Nemechek would bring the No. 20 back to the Xfinity Series on a full time basis. Nemecheck began the 2023 season with a second-place finish at Daytona. A week later, he won at Fontana.

Car No. 54 history

Multiple drivers (2013-2015)

In 2012, Kyle Busch fielded the No. 54 & After running the 54 for his team in 2012 with only one win (by his brother Kurt), Kyle Busch returned to JGR's strong Nationwide program with the No. 54 as a fourth JGR car, running 26 races and bringing sponsor Monster Energy with him. Parker Kligerman would take over the newly renumbered 77 for KBM. Busch didn't take long to get to victory lane. He won the pole, lead the most laps, and won the race in only the second race of the 2013 season at Phoenix International Raceway. He then scored victories at Bristol (4th race) and at Fontana (5th race).  During the 2013 season, he won a total of 12 races. Joey Coulter, Owen Kelly, and Drew Herring also ran in the 54, which finished 2nd in the owner's championship to the Team Penske No. 22 by one point.

For the 2014 season, Kyle Busch ran part-time the No. 54 car, running all Sprint Cup Series companion races except Talladega and Daytona in July. Former IRL champion Sam Hornish Jr., who was not re-signed by Team Penske after scoring a win and finishing 2nd in Nationwide points in 2013, ran 7 races to help compete for the owner's championship. At Iowa in May, Hornish won the Get To Know Newton 250, beating Ryan Blaney's 22 for his third career win. The 54 once again finished 2nd in owners points to the Penske 22.

In 2015, Kyle Busch suffered injuries during the season-opening race at Daytona. He broke his leg after hitting the inside wall that had no SAFER barrier installed. His replacements were announced to be Erik Jones (at least 3 races), Cup series teammate Denny Hamlin (5 races), and road course veteran Boris Said (7 races). Busch returned to the Xfinity Series at Michigan in June and scored his first win of the season. Jones scored a win the following race at Chicagoland, his second of the season.

Part-time (2020)
For the 2020 season Kyle Busch (5 races) and Denny Hamlin (1 race) will race in the No. 54 car (previously used in 2012-15).

Multiple drivers (2021)
On January 27, 2021, it was confirmed that Ty Gibbs, Ty Dillon, Denny Hamlin, Kyle Busch, and Martin Truex Jr. would drive the 54 car in select races for the 2021 season. Ty Gibbs won in his series debut at the Daytona Road Course while Busch won by 11 seconds at COTA. Following Busch’s win, Gibbs won again the next week at Charlotte holding off Austin Cindric for the second time. In the series’ return to Nashville Superspeedway, Busch made history by winning his 100th race. On July 3, Busch battled back from adversity to win the Henry 180 at Road America.

Ty Gibbs (2021-2022)
Ty Gibbs returned to the No. 54 in 2022 on a full-time basis. He won at Las Vegas, Atlanta, and Richmond. At the Martinsville spring race on April 8, Gibbs finished eighth after Sam Mayer did a bump and run on him on the final lap. After the race, Gibbs attempted to spin Mayer out during the cool-down laps before both drivers engaged in a fistfight on pit road.  In addition to this incident, Gibbs was fined 15,000 for hitting Mayer's car on pit road after the race. Gibbs scored his fourth win at Road America by passing Kyle Larson on the final lap. He claimed his fifth win of the season at Michigan. At Watkins Glen, Gibbs fiercely battled William Byron for the lead throughout most of the race until they both spun off-course during the final restart, resulting in Gibbs finishing 27th. At the Martinsville playoff race, Gibbs dumped Jones to the outside wall on the final overtime lap to win and make the Championship 4. After the race, he compared himself to Jesus in an interview on the SiriusXM NASCAR channel. Gibbs dominated at Phoenix to become the 2022 NASCAR Xfinity Series champion.

Car No. 81 history
The No. 81 car made its debut in 2021 as the fifth JGR entry at Road America. It was driven by Ty Gibbs while Kyle Busch occupied Gibbs' usual No. 54.

NASCAR Truck Series

From 2000 to 2002, Joe Gibbs fielded trucks numbered 20 and 48 in the Craftsman Truck Series for his sons Coy and J. D. Gibbs. Coy ran 12 races in 2000, then the full 2001 and 2002 seasons, with 21 top 10s and 10th-place points finishes in the latter two seasons. J.D. only ran a total of 8 races over the three seasons, with no top 10 finishes.

From 2004 to 2006, JGR drivers drove in the Truck Series for Chevrolet-affiliated Morgan-Dollar Motorsports, fielding Bobby Labonte, Tony Stewart, Denny Hamlin, J. J. Yeley, Jason Leffler, and Aric Almirola in select races. In 2006, JGR contracted Spears Motorsports to field Almirola in their 75 truck for his rookie Truck season. Almirola had three top 10s (compared to two top 10s in four starts the previous year), finishing 18th in points.

From 2010 through 2022, JGR drivers competed in the Truck Series through Kyle Busch Motorsports, owned by Cup Series driver Kyle Busch. KBM used JGR-built engines in competition. The partnership ended following the 2022 season when Busch left the organization.

ARCA Menards Series

In 1999, Joe Gibbs Racing fielded the No. 18 car for Jason Leffler for one race. Leffler finish 5th at Atlanta. In 2000, Leffler returned at Charlotte, he started 2nd and led one lap, however, he crashed with 55 of 67 laps completed.

From 2004 to 2005, Joe Gibbs Racing partnered with Shaver Motorsports to field development drivers in the ARCA Racing Series. Denny Hamlin finished third in the 2004 season finale at Talladega. J. J. Yeley ran the 2005 season opener at Daytona, as part of his development deal with JGR. Aric Almirola ran the 2005 finale at Talladega.

Car No. 18 history
Leffler raced one race in 1999 and one race in 2000 with No. 18.

In 2010, Joe Gibbs Racing entered the No. 18 at Michigan for Max Gresham which was also entered again as Brennan Poole due to Gresham having a contractual obligation for another team that day of the race although the team would later withdraw their entry from the race entirely.

On December 15, 2016, it was announced that JGR would field a car for Riley Herbst full-time in the 2017 season. Matt Tifft ran the season opener at Daytona due to Herbst not being eligible to compete in the race.

In 2018, Herbst returned for another full-time season. In 2019, Herbst drove the No. 18 for eight races, while Ty Gibbs drove for 11 races, winning at Gateway and Salem. Todd Gilliland drove one race at Pocono.

In 2020, Gibbs ran 16 races, winning six times, while Herbst ran the other four races. Despite missing four races, Gibbs finished fifth in the driver's standings. Gibbs also raced in the ARCA East series, winning at Toledo and finishing second in the standings of the six-race season. Gibbs ran full-time in 2021, winning 10 of the 20 races and finishing in the top three 17 times enroute to the series championship. Gibbs also ran a standalone ARCA West event at Phoenix in March and a standalone ARCA East event at Dover in May, winning both races. For 2022, the No. 18 was fielded by Kyle Busch Motorsports.

In 2023, the car returned to JGR, with Connor Mosack driving six races and William Sawalich driving 13 races.

Car No. 19 history
In 2018, Drew Herring drove the No. 19 NOS Energy Drink/ORCA Coolers/Advance Auto Parts Toyota at the season finale at Kansas, winning the pole and finishing 8th.

Car No. 81 history
In 2017, Riley Herbst was entered at the season opener in Daytona in the team's second car (No. 81), but he was ineligible to race. Herbst and Zane Smith were both ineligible to run the season opener at Daytona, though ARCA allowed both to participate in practice.

In 2022, JGR would bring back the No. 81 for Brandon Jones in five races with sponsorship from Menards. He would win three times: Charlotte, Iowa, and Watkins Glen.

Controversy
After the August 16, 2008 NASCAR Nationwide Series race at Michigan International Speedway, NASCAR used a dynamometer to test the horsepower of several cars from all competing manufacturers. While testing the two Joe Gibbs Racing cars, officials found that the throttle pedal on both cars had been manipulated using magnets a quarter-inch thick to prevent the accelerator from going 100 percent wide open. Joe Gibbs issued a statement saying "we will take full responsibility and accept any penalties NASCAR levied against us" and "we will also investigate internally how this incident took place and who was involved and make whatever decisions are necessary to ensure that this kind of situation never happens again." Seven crew members were suspended indefinitely and two drivers and the team were penalized 150 points apiece.

Additionally, JGR has been at the center of controversy regarding the closure of smaller teams who formed a technical alliance with them and TRD. Examples of this are the closure of Furniture Row Racing in 2018 and Leavine Family Racing in 2020.

Motocross team
In 2008, Gibbs branched out into motorcycle racing, forming the JGRMX team competing in the AMA motocross and Supercross championships. The team is based in Huntersville, North Carolina and is managed by Gibbs' son, Coy Gibbs.

On January 5, 2008 the Muscle Milk/Toyota/JGRMX Team made its racing debut in the first round of the 2008 Supercross Series in Anaheim, CA with riders Josh Hansen and Josh Summey. Josh Grant and Cody Cooper rode for the team in 2009, with Grant winning the opening round of Supercross at Anaheim. Grant and Justin Brayton rode for the team in 2010, and Davi Millsaps replaced Grant in 2011. James Stewart replaced Brayton in 2012, and won the Oakland and Daytona Supercrosses, while Millsaps finished second in points. On May 6, 2012, Stewart and the team officially parted ways.
 
Grant and Brayton returned as the team's two riders in 2013 and were joined by Phil Nicoletti in 2014. Justin Barcia and Weston Peick replaced Grant and Brayton on the team in 2015, with Barcia winning two nationals (Budds Creek and RedBud). In 2017, the team switched from Yamaha to Suzuki and added a 250cc effort, with Nicoletti and Matt Bisceglia. For 2018, JGRMX/Autotrader/Yoshimura Suzuki became the official factory Suzuki program, with riders Peick and Justin Bogle (450) and 2017 250SX West Champion Justin Hill, Nicoletti, Jimmy Decotis, and Kyle Peters (250). Hill scored a win at San Diego while Bogle missed most of the season with injuries as Malcolm Stewart filled in for him. The 2019 team consists of two-time Supercross champion Chad Reed, Peick, Hill (450), Decotis, Peters, Alex Martin, Enzo Lopes (250). Peick suffered serious facial injuries in a crash at the Paris Supercross in October 2018.

J. D. Gibbs health complications and passing
It was reported on March 25, 2015, that J. D. Gibbs had begun treatment for symptoms impacting areas of brain function, including speech and processing issues. It was later announced on January 11, 2019, that J. D. Gibbs had died following complications of degenerative neurological disease. A memorial service was held on January 25, 2019.

References

External links

Motocross Team Website

American auto racing teams
Companies based in North Carolina
NASCAR teams
Auto racing teams established in 1992
American racecar constructors